Freadelpha polyspila is a species of beetle in the family Cerambycidae. It was described by Harold in 1879. It is known from the Democratic Republic of the Congo, Tanzania, Angola, Zambia, and Malawi.

Varietas
 Freadelpha polyspila var. grandis (Jordan, 1903)
 Freadelpha polyspila var. imitatrix Breuning, 1935
 Freadelpha polyspila var. insignis Breuning, 1935
 Freadelpha polyspila var. unicolor Breuning, 1935

References

Sternotomini
Beetles described in 1879